Last of a Dyin' Breed is the fourteenth studio album by American Southern rock band Lynyrd Skynyrd.  The album was announced on May 2, 2012, for release on August 21, 2012, and September 17 in the UK. It is the first Lynyrd Skynyrd album to feature Peter Keys on keyboards and Johnny Colt on bass (even though credited, the latter is not on the tracks) and features guest guitarist John 5. It was also the final album to feature guitarist Gary Rossington before his death in 2023. The first single, "Last of a Dyin' Breed", was made available to purchase via iTunes on July 9, 2012.

Last of a Dyin' Breed peaked at No. 14 on the U.S. Billboard pop charts, topping the 2009 album God & Guns to become the band's highest-charting studio album since 1977's Street Survivors.

Track listing

Personnel
Lynyrd Skynyrd
Johnny Van Zant – lead vocals
Gary Rossington – lead guitar
Rickey Medlocke – lead guitar
Mark Matejka – lead guitar
Peter Keys – keyboards
Michael Cartellone – drums  (credited, but does not appear on the album)
Johnny Colt – bass   (credited, but does not appear on the album)

Additional personnel
Dale Krantz-Rossington – backing vocals (credited, but does not appear on the album)
Carol Chase – backing vocals (credited, but does not appear on the album)
Greg Morrow – drums
Mike Brignardello – bass guitar
John 5 – lead guitar
Jerry Douglas – dobro
Stacey Michelle Plunk – backing vocals
Chip Davis – backing vocals
Lisa Parade – strings arrangement and horns

Charts

References

Lynyrd Skynyrd albums
2012 albums
Roadrunner Records albums